Bureau of Plant Industry may be:
Bureau of Plant Industry (Philippines), an agency of the Philippine Department of Agriculture
Bureau of Plant Industry (United States), an agency of the United States Department of Agriculture
Nebraska Bureau of Plant Industry
Mississippi Bureau of Plant Industry